Easter egg may refer to:
Easter egg, a special egg often given to celebrate Easter 
Easter egg (media), an intentional hidden message

See also
Easter eggs in Microsoft products, hidden messages in some of Microsoft's early products
Wikipedia:EASTEREGG